St Benedicts Harps GAA is a Gaelic Athletic Association club in the Leeds area.

External links
 http://stbenedictsharps.intheteam.com

Gaelic football clubs in Britain
Sport in Leeds